The Iceland Open is an annual darts tournament on the WDF circuit that began in 2015.

List of winners

Men's

Women's

References

External links
The Icelandic Darts Association

2015 establishments in Iceland
Darts tournaments
Sport in Iceland